South Pekin is a village in Tazewell County, Illinois, United States. The population was 1,146 at the 2010 census and is part of the Peoria, Illinois Metropolitan Statistical Area.

History

South Pekin was incorporated on April 12, 1917, five miles south of Pekin in an area previously known as "McFadden Flats". The village is located in Sections 27 and 34 of Cincinnati Township, which was formed in 1850. South Pekin owes its origin to the Chicago and Northwestern Railroad, as a railway station.

Settlement in the South Pekin area began in the 1820s with the first arrival of white settlers to what would soon become Tazewell County. The Chicago and Northwestern Railroad made a series of corporate decisions that eventually led to the founding of the village. The railroad constructed its line from Nelson, Illinois to Peoria in 1901. In 1904, C&NW discovered a large coalfield near Staunton in Macoupin County. A few years later, C&NW decided to build a line of access to the coal field and carry freight between Chicago and St. Louis. By March 1912, the right of way had been purchased and construction was started. C&NW needed a water, refueling, and repair station midway on the new line. The first choice for the location of this new station was Green Valley, Illinois, but protests from residents there prompted a change of plans. A new location was chosen, and the railroad and its employees began to build the new station that became South Pekin. The first permanent resident, Al Casper arrived with his family on Christmas Day, 1912. As more families arrived, the railroad gave them boxcars to use as homes on a location that was known as McFadden Flats. The Village of South Pekin was incorporated on April 12, 1917.

The economic possibilities that came with the railroad caused business leaders in Pekin to be very interested to pull the switch yard closer and get the new "railroad people" with steady work and good pay in their town. Ultimately most employees opted to settle close to the yard which was already located in South Pekin. In addition to the numerous blue collar jobs the C&NW operation also brought management positions and erected a three story masonry office building (Demolished near the beginning of the 21st century). South Pekin was a home terminal for Chicago and Northwestern Railroad crews in the twentieth century. Trains were made up in the middle of the town in a "Kick" Yard. After the trains were put together, crews would get on the train and proceed south to East St. Louis or north to Nelson, where they would be relieved and allowed to sleep for the next tour of operation. The Chicago and Northwestern also maintained a bunkhouse in South Pekin where crews could stop for the night. In the 1970s train crews would go onward through Nelson and proceed to Proviso (a suburb of Chicago) or to Clinton, Iowa. At times there were as many as 20 + trains per day either made up at South Pekin or that went through South Pekin.

All these tracks running north-to-south through the middle of town created two communities—the East side and the west side. To reach the other side of town it was common to be delayed 20 minutes by switching operations or by a long train called a drag to clear the tracks. This was a problem sometimes as the fire station was on the west side and lead to a small fire building being constructed on the east side. There is another railroad line on the east side of South Pekin; the "Illinois Central". It would interchange cars onto a siding where they would be collated in the Northwestern trains. Not a lot of activity but this added to the awareness of railroads in the community.

In the early 1900s, South Pekin grew to be a bustling town with its own bank, grocery and general stores, bakery, service stations, restaurants, and two hotels (one on the East and one on the West) and all of the amenities due to the railroad traffic. The center of the social world was the Comfort Inn on the West Side which offered Vaudeville, dancing, flickers, pool hall, barber, minor gambling, dining and bar. The bustling activity of the town slowed in the late 20th century and many businesses faded with the role of railroads. In the post war period South Pekin was a place that one would associate with average America.

South Pekin has been a home to a recording studio called Golden Voice Recording, owned and operated by Jerry L and Mary Anne Milam.

South Pekin continues to hang on to the Midwestern way and is currently a village of approximately 1100 people (in accordance with 2010 census information). The village, like the rest of America has been hit by the recession. Plans for a new subdivision have fallen through due to the housing bubble burst. However, as of 2013 it seems the town may be rebounding as small businesses have expressed interest in the village. South Pekin's history can be roughly divided into four time segments: the original C&NW era with growth, the post war period where the town did not grow but held its own, some decline and loss of almost all businesses, including most of the C&NW which is now Union Pacific, and slow growth after 2013.

Disasters

South Pekin has seen its share of disasters, starting with flooding during the Midwest Flood of 1927. The town's worst disaster was the F3 tornado of March 30, 1938 that destroyed much of South Pekin and killed nine of the village’s residents, it remains the deadliest tornado in Central Illinois 75 years later. National Weather Service research suggests the storm was a super-cell that spawned up to five tornadoes. On May 9, 1995 another tornado rated F1 moved northeast across town, destroying several garages and destroying a railroad barracks. Two injuries and around one million dollars in damage was reported. On May 15, a tornado touched down just south of town that would later hit Tremont. On May 10, 2003, South Pekin was again hit by a tornado. The tornado touched down three miles southwest of town around 9:45 P.M. and crossed Highway 29 into the village at F3 intensity. It went through the village at 9:50 PM and was about a quarter mile wide. There were 23 injuries in South Pekin but no fatalities. The town was rebuilt over the next ten years and constructed a new tornado warning system.

Geography

Demographics

As of 2010, there were 1,146 people, 437 households, and 314 families residing in the village. The population density was 2,292 people per square mile (884 people/km). There were 437 housing units at an average density of 874 per square mile (337.5 housing units/km). The racial makeup of the village was 98.17% White, 0.35% Black, 0.17% Native American, 0.09% Asian, and 0.96% from two or more races. Hispanic or Latino origin made up 1.31%.

In the village, the population was spread out, with 31.0% under the age of 18, 9.1% from 18 to 24, 32.3% from 25 to 44, 18.1% from 45 to 64, and 9.6% who were 65 years of age or older. The median age was 31 years. For every 100 females, there were 97.6 males. For every 100 females age 18 and over, there were 95.1 males.

The median income for a household in the village was $40,455, and the median income for a family was $42,102. Males had a median income of $32,292 versus $20,125 for females. The per capita income for the village was $15,717. About 6.1% of families and 7.1% of the population were below the poverty line, including 6.0% of those under age 18 and none of those age 65 or over. The unemployment rate in South Pekin was 6.2% as of March 2015. While higher than the national unemployment rate, this is lower than the state average and significantly lower than other communities in the metro area.

See also
 May 2003 tornado outbreak sequence

References

http://www.pekintimes.com/article/20131227/NEWS/131229406/?tag=1

Villages in Tazewell County, Illinois
Villages in Illinois
Peoria metropolitan area, Illinois
Populated places established in 1914